The 2016 Conference USA men's basketball tournament was held from March 8–12, 2016, in Birmingham, Alabama, at Legacy Arena.  Southern Miss did not participate in the tournament due to a self-imposed a postseason ban for pending NCAA violations. Middle Tennessee won the tournament, receiving the conference's automatic bid to the NCAA tournament.

Seeds
Only 13 conference teams were eligible for the tournament. As a result, the top 11 teams received a bye to the Second Round of the tournament. The top 4 teams received a double bye to the Quarterfinals of the tournament.

Teams were seeded by record within the conference, with a tiebreaker system to seed teams with identical conference records.

Schedule

Bracket

See also
2016 Conference USA women's basketball tournament

References

Tournament
Conference USA men's basketball tournament
College sports tournaments in Alabama
Basketball competitions in Birmingham, Alabama
Conference USA men's basketball tournament
Conference USA men's basketball tournament